John Smolenski may refer to:

 John Smolenski (historian) (born 1973), American historian
 John Smolenski (politician) (1891–1953), American politician

See also